Candace Charles (born 1990) is a Guyanese beauty ambassador and local model who has been a representative for the country in various pageants including Miss World 2007 held in China, and Miss Europe & World Junior pageant in Czech Republic from September 20 to October 5, 2008. Candace received a bachelor's degree in Food and Beverage Management from Kendall College in Chicago, USA in 2015.

Candace currently owns Night Cap, a cafe and restaurant in Georgetown, Guyana.

References

External links

Miss World 2007 delegates
1990 births
Living people
Guyanese beauty pageant winners
Guyanese expatriates in the United States